Sauk Valley Community College (SVCC) is a public community college in Dixon, Illinois, United States.  It was established in 1965 and was built on the Rock River between the cities of Sterling and Dixon.

The college offers an assortment of transfer degree majors (e.g., A.A., A.S.), career-technical degrees (A.A.S.) and certificates. It enrolls about 2,000 full and part-time students each semester. Sauk provides numerous opportunities for educational growth including programs in adult education (G.E.D. or E.S.L) and classes in personal and professional enrichment. Sauk's district includes portions of Bureau, Lee, Henry, Carroll, Ogle, and Whiteside counties.

It is accredited by the Higher Learning Commission. The Radiation Technology program is accredited by the Joint Review Committee on Education in Radiologic Technology.

Academics

The college offers:

Associate in Science
Associate in Arts
Associate in Engineering Science
Associate in Liberal Studies
Associate in Applied Science
Certificates in career-technical fields

Athletics
Sauk is a member of the Arrowhead Athletic Conference and participates in the highest level of National Junior College Athletic Association (NJCAA) competition. 

 Men's basketball
 Women's basketball
 Baseball
 Softball
 Cross-country
 Women's tennis
 Men's tennis
 Volleyball
 Golf
Track

References

External links

Community colleges in Illinois
Education in Lee County, Illinois
Dixon, Illinois
1965 establishments in Illinois
NJCAA athletics
Educational institutions established in 1965